Dorian Bylykbashi (born 8 August 1980, in Elbasan) is a former Albanian footballer. He mainly played as an attacking midfielder and he has previously played for KF Elbasani and Vllaznia Shkodër in Albania as well as for Ukrainian side Kryvbas Kryvyi Rih.

He was in the Partizani squad that won the Albanian Cup and Albanian Supercup in the 2003–04 season.

Club career

Elbasani
In January 2011, Bylykbashi signed a five-month contract with his first club Elbasani, with Bylykbashi earning €35,000 a season.

Partizani Tirana
He was unveiled as Partizani Tirana's first January signing at the club's end of year party on 21 December 2014, before the transfer window had opened.

International career
He made his debut for Albania in a March 2006 friendly match against Lithuania and earned a total of 6 caps, scoring no goals. His final international was an August 2010 friendly match against Uzbekistan.

Honours

Club
Vllaznia
Albanian Superliga (1): 2000–01
Partizani
Albanian Cup (1): 2003–04
Albanian Supercup (1): 2004
Elbasani
Albanian First Division (2): 2001–02, 2013–14

Individual
Albanian Superliga Top goalscorer (1): 2004–05

References

External links

 

1980 births
Living people
Footballers from Elbasan
Albanian footballers
Association football forwards
Albania international footballers
KF Elbasani players
KF Vllaznia Shkodër players
FK Partizani Tirana players
FC Kryvbas Kryvyi Rih players
Kategoria Superiore players
Ukrainian Premier League players
Albanian expatriate footballers
Expatriate footballers in Ukraine
Albanian expatriate sportspeople in Ukraine